Still Life with a Sketch after Delacroix is an oil painting by the French artist Paul Gauguin. The undated work is thought to have been painted during the artist's 1887 stay in Martinique. Its inventory number is 55.974.0.662.

The painting depicts a still life of exotic fruit and a large glass bottle on a wooden table. On the wall behind hangs an engraving after a sketch by Eugène Delacroix, depicting The Expulsion of Adam and Eve from Paradise. Gauguin's work thus represents the loss of a traditional Paradise and the gain of new one, represented by the generous nature of a far-away island.

References

External links 

Nature morte à l’esquisse de Delacroix  on the museum's website

Paintings in the collection of the Strasbourg Museum of Modern and Contemporary Art
Paintings by Paul Gauguin
1880s paintings
Still life paintings
Oil on canvas paintings